Prairie Township is an inactive township in Schuyler County, in the U.S. state of Missouri.

Prairie Township was erected in 1853.

References

Townships in Missouri
Townships in Schuyler County, Missouri